Acupalpus indistinctus is an insect-eating ground beetle of the genus Acupalpus. The species was first described by Dejean in 1831.

References

indistinctus
Beetles described in 1831